Khnatsakh or Khanyurdu is a village de facto in the Askeran Province of the breakaway Republic of Artsakh, de jure in the Khojaly District of Azerbaijan, in the disputed region of Nagorno-Karabakh. The village has an ethnic Armenian-majority population, and also had an Armenian majority in 1989. The village is located to the immediate north of the city of Stepanakert.

History 

The modern village was founded in 1770 by settlers from the village of Khnatsakh in the Syunik region of Armenia. During the Soviet period, the village was part of the Askeran District of the Nagorno-Karabakh Autonomous Oblast.

Historical heritage sites 
Historical heritage sites in and around the village include the 12th/13th-century village of Kghategh, a 13th-century khachkar, the 17th/18th-century shrine of Parur, an 18th/19th-century cemetery, and the 19th-century church of Surb Astvatsatsin.

Economy and culture 
The population is mainly engaged in agriculture and animal husbandry, as well as in different state institutions. As of 2015, the village has a municipal building, a house of culture, a secondary school, and a medical centre.

Demographics 
The village had 592 inhabitants in 2005, and 684 inhabitants in 2015.

Gallery

References

External links 

 

Populated places in Askeran Province
Populated places in Khojaly District